This page provides supplementary chemical data on 1,2-dichloroethane.

Structure and properties

Thermodynamic properties

Vapor pressure of liquid

Table data obtained from CRC Handbook of Chemistry and Physics 44th ed. The (s) annotation indicates temperature is equilibrium of vapor over solid. Otherwise temperature is equilibrium of vapor over liquid.

Distillation data
See also:
 Tetrachloroethylene (data page)

Spectral data

References

 

Dichloroethane
Chemical data pages cleanup